Abrázame muy fuerte may refer to:

Abrázame Muy Fuerte (album), a 2000 album by Juan Gabriel
"Abrázame Muy Fuerte" (song), the album's title track
Abrázame muy fuerte (TV series), 2000 telenovela